South Sligo was a parliamentary constituency in Ireland, which returned one Member of Parliament (MP) to the House of Commons of the Parliament of the United Kingdom, elected on a system of first-past-the-post, from 1885 to 1922.

Prior to the 1885 general election the area was part of the two-seat Sligo constituency. From 1922, on the establishment of the Irish Free State, it was not represented in the UK Parliament.

Boundaries
This constituency comprised the southern part of County Sligo.

1885–1922: The baronies of Coolavin, Corran and Tirerrill, and that part of the Barony of Leyny not contained within the constituency of North Sligo.

Members of Parliament

Elections

Sexton is also elected MP for Belfast North and opts to sit there, causing a by-election.

Kennedy resigns, causing a second by-election.

Elections in the 1890s

Elections in the 1900s

Elections in the 1910s

References

Historic constituencies in County Sligo
Westminster constituencies in County Sligo (historic)
Dáil constituencies in the Republic of Ireland (historic)
Constituencies of the Parliament of the United Kingdom established in 1885
Constituencies of the Parliament of the United Kingdom disestablished in 1922